Truro Aerodrome  is an unlicensed aerodrome located  west northwest of Truro, Cornwall, England, UK.

In 2012, its existence was threatened by plans for residential development associated with the proposed Stadium for Cornwall.

References

Airports in Cornwall
Truro